Rhyssoleptoneta is a genus of East Asian leptonetids containing 2 species, Rhyssoleptoneta latitarsa and Rhyssoleptoneta aosen. It was first described by Y. F. Tong & S. Q. Li in 2007, and has only been found in China. The male of the type species was first described in 2007, and the female was first described in 2012.

Species
 it contains two species:
 Rhyssoleptoneta aosen Zhu & Li, 2021 — China
 Rhyssoleptoneta latitarsa Tong & Li, 2007 (type) — China

See also
 List of Leptonetidae species

References

Leptonetidae
Araneomorphae genera